The 4th constituency of the Aisne is a French legislative constituency in the Aisne département.

Description

Aisne's 4th constituency covers the territory around Soissons in the west of the department.

In common with other seats in Aisne the 4th constituency switched from the Gaullist to the Communists in the 1970s and maintained a preference for the left between then and 2017.

Historic representation

Election results

2022

2017

2012

|- style="background-color:#E9E9E9;text-align:center;"
! colspan="2" rowspan="2" style="text-align:left;" | Candidate
! rowspan="2" colspan="2" style="text-align:left;" | Party
! colspan="2" | 1st round
! colspan="2" | 2nd round
|- style="background-color:#E9E9E9;text-align:center;"
! width="75" | Votes
! width="30" | %
! width="75" | Votes
! width="30" | %
|-
| style="background-color:" |
| style="text-align:left;" | Marie-Françoise Bechtel
| style="text-align:left;" | Citizen and Republican Movement
| MRC
| 
| 23.37%
| 
| 53.62%
|-
| style="background-color:" |
| style="text-align:left;" | Isabelle Letrillart
| style="text-align:left;" | Union for a Popular Movement
| UMP
| 
| 24.31%
| 
| 46.38%
|-
| style="background-color:" |
| style="text-align:left;" | Evelyne Ruelle
| style="text-align:left;" | National Front
| FN
| 
| 18.70%
| colspan="2" style="text-align:left;" |
|-
| style="background-color:" |
| style="text-align:left;" | Jean-Luc Lanouilh
| style="text-align:left;" | Left Front
| FG
| 
| 17.31%
| colspan="2" style="text-align:left;" |
|-
| style="background-color:" |
| style="text-align:left;" | Frédéric Alliot
| style="text-align:left;" | 
| RDG
| 
| 9.50%
| colspan="2" style="text-align:left;" |
|-
| style="background-color:" |
| style="text-align:left;" | Charles-Edouard Lauriston
| style="text-align:left;" | Radical Party
| PRV
| 
| 2.07%
| colspan="2" style="text-align:left;" |
|-
| style="background-color:" |
| style="text-align:left;" | Stéphanie Lebee
| style="text-align:left;" | The Greens
| VEC
| 
| %
| colspan="2" style="text-align:left;" |
|-
| style="background-color:" |
| style="text-align:left;" | Martine Lehideux
| style="text-align:left;" | Far Right
| EXD
| 
| 0.96%
| colspan="2" style="text-align:left;" |
|-
| style="background-color:" |
| style="text-align:left;" | Michelle Sapori
| style="text-align:left;" | Miscellaneous Right
| DVD
| 
| 0.82%
| colspan="2" style="text-align:left;" |
|-
| style="background-color:" |
| style="text-align:left;" | Laetitia Voisin
| style="text-align:left;" | Far Left
| EXG
| 
| 0.65%
| colspan="2" style="text-align:left;" |
|-
| style="background-color:" |
| style="text-align:left;" | Barbara Knockaert
| style="text-align:left;" | Far Left
| EXG
| 
| 0.62%
| colspan="2" style="text-align:left;" |
|-
| colspan="8" style="background-color:#E9E9E9;"|
|- style="font-weight:bold"
| colspan="4" style="text-align:left;" | Total
| 
| 100%
| 
| 100%
|-
| colspan="8" style="background-color:#E9E9E9;"|
|-
| colspan="4" style="text-align:left;" | Registered voters
| 
| style="background-color:#E9E9E9;"|
| 
| style="background-color:#E9E9E9;"|
|-
| colspan="4" style="text-align:left;" | Blank/Void ballots
| 
| 1.40%
| 
| 3.76%
|-
| colspan="4" style="text-align:left;" | Turnout
| 
| 55.34%
| 
| 53.67%
|-
| colspan="4" style="text-align:left;" | Abstentions
| 
| 44.66%
| 
| 46.33%
|-
| colspan="8" style="background-color:#E9E9E9;"|
|- style="font-weight:bold"
| colspan="6" style="text-align:left;" | Result
| colspan="2" style="background-color:" | MRC GAIN
|}

2007

|- style="background-color:#E9E9E9;text-align:center;"
! colspan="2" rowspan="2" style="text-align:left;" | Candidate
! rowspan="2" colspan="2" style="text-align:left;" | Party
! colspan="2" | 1st round
! colspan="2" | 2nd round
|- style="background-color:#E9E9E9;text-align:center;"
! width="75" | Votes
! width="30" | %
! width="75" | Votes
! width="30" | %
|-
| style="background-color:" |
| style="text-align:left;" | Jacques Desallangre
| style="text-align:left;" | Miscellaneous Left
| DVG
| 
| 26.17%
| 
| 54.58%
|-
| style="background-color:" |
| style="text-align:left;" | Brigitte Thuin-Macherez
| style="text-align:left;" | Union for a Popular Movement
| UMP
| 
| 32.12%
| 
| 45.42%
|-
| style="background-color:" |
| style="text-align:left;" | Claire le Flecher
| style="text-align:left;" | Socialist Party
| PS
| 
| 16.24%
| colspan="2" style="text-align:left;" |
|-
| style="background-color:" |
| style="text-align:left;" | Wallerand de Saint Just
| style="text-align:left;" | National Front
| FN
| 
| 8.26%
| colspan="2" style="text-align:left;" |
|-
| style="background-color:" |
| style="text-align:left;" | Isabelle Letrillart
| style="text-align:left;" | Movement for France
| MPF
| 
| 5.11%
| colspan="2" style="text-align:left;" |
|-
| style="background-color:" |
| style="text-align:left;" | Yannick Sable
| style="text-align:left;" | Democratic Movement
| MoDem
| 
| 4.32%
| colspan="2" style="text-align:left;" |
|-
| style="background-color:" |
| style="text-align:left;" | Dominique Natanson
| style="text-align:left;" | Far Left
| EXG
| 
| 2.24%
| colspan="2" style="text-align:left;" |
|-
| style="background-color:" |
| style="text-align:left;" | Vincent Bocquet
| style="text-align:left;" | The Greens
| VEC
| 
| 1.92%
| colspan="2" style="text-align:left;" |
|-
| style="background-color:" |
| style="text-align:left;" | Laetitia Voisin
| style="text-align:left;" | Far Left
| EXG
| 
| 1.46%
| colspan="2" style="text-align:left;" |
|-
| style="background-color:" |
| style="text-align:left;" | Henri Lienaux
| style="text-align:left;" | Hunting, Fishing, Nature, Traditions
| CPNT
| 
| 1.26%
| colspan="2" style="text-align:left;" |
|-
| style="background-color:" |
| style="text-align:left;" | Philippe Enguehard
| style="text-align:left;" | Divers
| DIV
| 
| 0.84%
| colspan="2" style="text-align:left;" |
|-
| style="background-color:" |
| style="text-align:left;" | Houssens Besbas
| style="text-align:left;" | Divers
| DIV
| 
| 0.05%
| colspan="2" style="text-align:left;" |
|-
| colspan="8" style="background-color:#E9E9E9;"|
|- style="font-weight:bold"
| colspan="4" style="text-align:left;" | Total
| 
| 100%
| 
| 100%
|-
| colspan="8" style="background-color:#E9E9E9;"|
|-
| colspan="4" style="text-align:left;" | Registered voters
| 
| style="background-color:#E9E9E9;"|
| 
| style="background-color:#E9E9E9;"|
|-
| colspan="4" style="text-align:left;" | Blank/Void ballots
| 
| 1.61%
| 
| 2.46%
|-
| colspan="4" style="text-align:left;" | Turnout
| 
| 57.82%
| 
| 58.76%
|-
| colspan="4" style="text-align:left;" | Abstentions
| 
| 42.18%
| 
| 41.24%
|-
| colspan="8" style="background-color:#E9E9E9;"|
|- style="font-weight:bold"
| colspan="6" style="text-align:left;" | Result
| colspan="2" style="background-color:" | DVG HOLD
|}

Sources
 Official results of French elections from 1998: 

4